OJSC Raspadskaya is a Russia-based coal-mining company owned by Evraz (82%)  and headquartered in Mezhdurechensk, Kemerovo Oblast. The company produces 7 million tons of coal per year (in 2012).

In addition to the main Raspadskaya coal mine, Russia's largest single underground mine, Raspadskaya group consists of about 20 industrial, transportation, infrastructure and financial enterprises. The company export to Ukraine and Eastern Europe and its in the process of actively exploring entry to the South-Asian markets.

Structure
Raspadskaya Group includes the following companies:
 OJSC "Mezhdurechenskaya Coal Company-96" (MUK-96)
 CJSC Raspadskaya Koksovaya underground mine
 CJSC "Razrez-Raspadsky" open-pit mine
 CJSC Raspadskaya Preparation Plant
 Olzherasskoye Shaft-Sinking Unit, Tomusinskoye Cargo Handling Unit, Montazhnik Raspadskoy, Raspadskaya Joy, Puteets, Raspadsky Ugol
 Satkinsky ironworks (Satka, Chelyabinsk Oblast).

Raspadskaya coal mine

Raspadskaya's total resources were estimated at 1,461 million tons and total coal reserves at 782 million ton (JORC standards, according to IMC Consulting report as of June 2006, of which 22 million tons produced by 31 March 2008). High quality of our reserves allows us to employ highly productive modern equipment and achieve high recovery rates. Based on the volume produced in 2007, our reserves-to-production ratio amounts to about 55 years of production.

References

External links
 raspadskaya.com
 article about the company

Coal companies of Russia
Non-renewable resource companies established in 1973
Companies listed on the Moscow Exchange
Evraz
Companies based in Kemerovo Oblast
Mining companies of the Soviet Union
1973 establishments in Russia